The common aspen leaf miner or aspen serpentine leafminer (Phyllocnistis populiella) is a moth of the family Gracillariidae. It is found in northern North America, including Alberta, Massachusetts, Ontario and Alaska.

The larvae feed on Populus tremuloides and balsam poplar. The larvae feed on the contents of epidermal cells on both top and bottom surfaces of quaking aspen leaves, leaving the photosynthetic tissue of the mesophyll intact. This type of feeding is taxonomically restricted to a small subset of leaf mining insects but can cause widespread plant damage during outbreaks.

External links
Insects of Alberta
Bug Guide

Phyllocnistis
Leaf miners